Housatonic Valley Regional High School (HVRHS) is a public high school in Falls Village, Connecticut, United States. It was established in 1939 as a result of a special act of the Connecticut General Assembly in 1937. It is the first regional high school in New England.

History 
Prior to the opening of Housatonic Valley Regional High School, four of the six towns it currently serves each had its own high school. In the 1920s, William Teague, the state's rural supervisor of schools, suggested that Connecticut's sprawling Northwest Corner consolidate its public schools. In 1937, the Connecticut General Assembly authorized the formation of the first regional school district in the state (hence the name of the new district, "Regional School District Number One"). The newly formed board of education purchased the  former Lorch farm at the junction of the Salmon Kill and the Housatonic River near the Canaan-Salisbury town line for $8,000. The school was subsequently constructed on that site, opening in the fall of 1939.

In 2001, the school facility expanded; adding a new agricultural education center, library, and updated science labs. The school facility includes one gymnasium, an auditorium, a cafeteria and dozens of classrooms. The school sat under the shadow of a white oak, from which the yearbook The White Oak takes its name.  The historic White Oak was so badly damaged in a storm on Monday, July 5, 2004, shortly after the arrival of previous principal Gretchen Foster, that it was taken down. The School also has two other courtyards: the Sophomore Courtyard located near the cafeteria, and the Faculty Courtyard (formerly Freshman courtyard).  In 2007, HVRHS became the North American Champions of the Canon Envirothon competition.

In early 2008, a plan was unveiled to renovate the former Clarke B. Wood Agricultural Center on campus.  Part of that building, closed in 2001 after construction of a new Agriculture Center, has been turned into the artgarage, an afterschool activity center.  The main part of that building was renovated into the Mahoney-Hewat Science and Technology Center, containing areas for extended curriculum activities needing more space than in the school's science laboratories and includes permanent space for the high school's robotics team (FIRST # 716), electric vehicle construction, a conference room with space for the Alumni Association activities, a business office for the 21st Century organization and various displays and supplies. The renovations were completed late 2012 and will serve not only high school students but all the CT Region One School District schools and students.

Curriculum 
In addition to the standard high school curricula, the school offers a variety of elective classes including drawing, color and design, painting, photography, pottery, sculpture, wood technology, metal technology, drafting, and a wide array of courses in agriculture.

Athletics 
Housatonic supports a large number of sports in comparison to other schools in its league. Housatonic has earned three state championships; Girls Track (1985 and 1988) and Division IX Golf (2007). Its notable alumni to continue on to professional sports careers are John Lamb and Steve Blass, both Major League Baseball pitchers for the Pittsburgh Pirates. Blass was drafted out of HVRHS, and pitched in the 1971 World Series. He is currently a sportscaster for the Pirates.

The Housatonic mascot is The Mountaineer. The school's colors are royal blue and gold, and it is a member of the Berkshire League (it is a member of the Pequot Uncas for football). The school has the following sports:

Boys' sports 
Fall
 Football
 Soccer (Berkshire League Champions 2005, Berkshire League Runners-up 2010, 2011, 2012)
 Cross-Country

Winter
 Basketball
 Hockey
 Swimming
 Wrestling
 Alpine Skiing

Spring
 Baseball
 Track and Field
 Tennis
 Lacrosse
 Golf

Girls' sports 
Fall
Soccer (Class S Runners-up 2014)
Cross Country (Class S Runners-up 2016, Berkshire League Runners-up 2015, 2016)
Volleyball (Berkshire League Champions 2007)
Field Hockey

Winter
Basketball (Berkshire League Champions 2007-08)
Swimming
Alpine Skiing (CHAMPS 2007-08)

Spring
Softball
Track (Berkshire League Runner-ups 2016)
Tennis
Lacrosse
Golf

Notable alumni 

 Steve Blass, former MLB player
 James J. Casey, politician
 Ron Garney, comic book artist
 John Lamb, former MLB player
  Jim Lawson, comic book artist
 Peter Reilly, charged in 1973 at then 18 with the murder of his mother, Barbara Gibbons, whose case became the subject of both the 1976 true crime novel, A Death in Canaan, and the 1978 made for television movie named for and about it.

References

External links 
 

Salisbury, Connecticut
Canaan (town), Connecticut
Schools in Litchfield County, Connecticut
Public high schools in Connecticut
Educational institutions established in 1939
1939 establishments in Connecticut